The 2014 Junior Pan Pacific Swimming Championships were held from 27 to 31 August 2014 in Maui, Hawaii, United States. Pool competition was conducted in a long course (50 metre) pool at Kihei Aquatic Center in Kihei, Hawaii and the open water marathons were contested at Ulua Beach in Wailea, Hawaii.

Medalists were determined based on results in the A-final with finals conducted in an A-final and B-final format. This marked a change in nomenclature from the 2012 edition where the medalists were determined from the Championship final and the second final was termed the Consolation final.

Results

Men

Women

Medal table

Championships records set
The following Championships records were set during the course of competition.

References

External links
 Results

Swimming competitions in the United States
2014 in swimming
August 2014 sports events in the United States
2014 in sports in Hawaii